The  is a city tram station on the Takaoka Kidō Line located in Takaoka, Toyama Prefecture, Japan.

Surrounding area
Shimin Byōin (Shimin Hospital or Takaoka Municipal Hospital)
Hello Work Takaoka

Railway stations in Toyama Prefecture